Picauville is a commune in the Manche department in Normandy in north-western France. On 1 January 2016, the former communes of Amfreville, Cretteville, Gourbesville, Houtteville and Vindefontaine were merged into Picauville. On 1 January 2017, the former commune of Les Moitiers-en-Bauptois was merged into Picauville. The inhabitants are called Picauvillais. Picauville also has a 17th century castle, classified as a historical landmark by the French government, called the Isle-Marie Castle. Parts of the structure date to the 11th century.

Heraldry

World War II
Picauville was one of the first towns liberated by Allied forces following the Normandy landings in early June 1944; German General Wilhelm Falley was killed there by an American paratrooper shortly after the invasion began. Engineers of the Ninth Air Force IX Engineering Command began construction of a combat Advanced Landing Ground to the northwest of the town. Declared operational on 26 June, the airfield was designated as "A-8", it was used by the 405th Fighter Group which flew P-47 Thunderbolts until mid-September when the unit moved to St. Dizier, near Nancy.  Afterward, the airfield was closed. A cairn marking the location of the airfield is on the east side of the D69, 2.3 km outside of Picauville on the way to Gourbesville (49°23'34.19"N,  1°25'07.69"E).

See also
 Communes of the Manche department

References

External links

 Picauville Public Library official website (médiathèque de Picauville)

Communes of Manche